Conly Leroy Rieder is a cancer researcher in the field of mitotic cellular division. The bulk of his research between 1980 and  2011 was funded through NIH grants and conducted at the Wadsworth Center in the New York State Department of Health in Albany, New York. He has published on the subjects of chromosome motility, spindle assembly,  and mitotic checkpoints. His research has contributed to the growing understanding of the process of cell division and the pathology of cancer.

Professional life

Education and early career
Rieder began his interest in biology at UC Irvine, where he obtained his B.S. in 1972. He completed his graduate work at the University of Oregon under Dr. Andrew Bajer, receiving his M.S. in 1975 and his Ph.D. in 1977. He then went on to pursue post-doctoral studies under Dr. Hans Ris at the University of Wisconsin-Madison where he focused on high power electron microscopy.

Work at the Wadsworth Center
In 1980, Rieder was offered a position at the New York State Department of Health, where he achieved tenure within three years. Throughout his career, he published over a hundred full-length peer-reviewed research papers on the topic of cell division. His articles have appeared in highly ranked journals, including multiple publications in Science, Nature and The Journal of Cell Biology. His pictures of newt lung cells undergoing the various stages of mitosis have appeared on numerous covers of the aforementioned journals alongside his articles. Additionally, Dr. Rieder has contributed to, and edited, a variety of widely read textbooks  and encyclopedia articles.

As a cell biologist, Rieder was the first to observe microtubule capture by kinetochores in live cells. This process was predicted by Mark Kirschner and Tim Mitchison in 1986, who formulated the so-called 'Search and Capture' hypothesis of mitotic spindle assembly. Rieder's 1990 papers provided the first direct observation of this process. Rieder also developed the concept of 'polar wind', an ejection force that ejects chromosome arms from the spindle. This hypothesis stems from the laser experiments conducted in the 1990s, and is a concept still widely accepted by the field today.

Rieder contributed significantly to the concept of 'spindle assembly checkpoint' (SAC). Rieder pioneered the idea that cells remain in mitosis until each chromosome becomes attached to the spindle and only then mitotic exit is initiated. By using the laser to ablate kinetochores on individual chromosomes, Rieder proved that the signal that delays mitotic progression is produced by kinetochores that lack attachment to spindle microtubules.

During his time in the field, Rieder specialized in electron microscopy and serial sectioning and three-dimensional imaging of cells. He was a pioneer of correlative light and electron microscopy (CLEM), which can allow researchers to match dynamic cellular processes with high resolution structural images.

Throughout his career, Rieder has shared his work at a variety of scientific forums, worked with other leading researchers in the field,  and has mentored scientists through their graduate and post-doctoral work. In January 2012, Rieder retired from the New York State Department of Health after a 32-year career. He then worked as Editor in Chief of Chromosome Research  for 8 years before retiring.

Personal life
Conly Rieder was born on November 2, 1950 in Orange County, California. He was the son of a World War II pilot, and thus spent several years in Japan in his youth.

In 1979, Rieder married Susan Nowogrodzki, a ceramicist, while working in Madison, Wisconsin. The couple has two daughters.

Rieder currently lives in Upstate New York with his wife, Susan.

References

External links
 List of Recent Notable Publications
 Official Lab Site
 State Bio

Cancer researchers
Living people
1950 births